Daniella Donado Visbal is a Colombian actress, presenter, and model, recognized for her participation in television series in that country.

Career
Donado achieved repercussions in her native country by being crowned queen of the Barranquilla Carnival in 2007. Immediately afterward she began a career as an actress, recording appearances in television series such as Oye bonita , Tierra de cantores , La Madame, Los protegidos , Pambelé, and La selection, among others, in addition to participating in the reality show Desafío 2014: Morocco, the thousand and one nights and its association with the Telecaribe television channel as a presenter. In 2015 he received a nomination for the y Novelas Awards in the category of best supporting actress in a telenovela for her participation in A dream called salsa . In 2020, she was linked to the Telecaribe Breicok channel project, a television series that began its transmission on the regional channel on May 4.

Filmography

Television
Breicok (2020) — Vanessa Arango 
 Today is the day (2017) — (Presenter) 
Pambelé (2017) 
A dream called salsa (2014) — Natalia 
The Madame (2013)
 The selection (2013) — Daniela Castro
Land of singers (2010)
Hey pretty (2008)
The protected (2008)

Reality 
Challenge 2014: Morocco, the thousand and one nights

References

Living people
Colombian television actresses
Colombian television presenters
Colombian women television presenters
Colombian female models
People from Barranquilla
21st-century Colombian actresses
Year of birth missing (living people)